Cornworthy Priory was a priory in Devon, England. It was founded in the early thirteenth century, for Augustinian nuns, and existed until 1536. At the Dissolution of the Monasteries the lands passed to the Harris family, and remained in the family until the 1640s. Thomas Harris who was a Serjeant-at-Law lived here with his wife Elizabeth. Their daughter, Anne, Lady Southwell, who was a noted poet, was born here.

References

See also
List of monastic houses in Devon
List of monastic houses in England

Monasteries in Devon
1536 disestablishments in England
Christian monasteries established in the 13th century
13th-century establishments in England